These were the team rosters of the nations participating in the Boys' ice hockey tournament of the 2016 Winter Youth Olympics. Each team was permitted a roster of 15 skaters and 2 goaltenders.

Canada 
The following is the Canadian roster for the Boys' ice hockey tournament at the 2016 Winter Youth Olympics.

Head coach: Martin Raymond

 Alexis Gravel (G)
 Olivier Rodrigue (G)
 Jett Woo (D)
 Jared McIsaac (D)
 Ty Smith (D)
 Ryan Merkley (D)
 Dennis Busby (D)
 Declan Chisholm (D)
 Benoît-Olivier Groulx (FW)
 Aidan Dudas (FW)
 Gabriel Fortier (FW)
 Luka Burzan (FW)
 Tristen Nielsen (FW)
 Anderson MacDonald (FW)
 Allan McShane (FW)
 Carson Focht (FW)
 Connor Roberts (FW)

Finland 
The following is the Finnish roster for the Boys' ice hockey tournament at the 2016 Winter Youth Olympics.

Head coach: Tommi Niemelä

 Tobias Akerman
 Justus Annunen
 Konsta Hirvonen
 Jesperi Kotkaniemi
 Miska Kukkonen
 Rasmus Kupari
 Eetu Maki
 Kalle Matikainen
 Jesse Moilanen
 Arttu Nevasaari
 Niklas Nordgren
 Jasper Rannisto
 Uula Ruikka
 Santeri Salmela
 Samuel Salonen
 Toni Utunen
 Jimi Uusitalo

Norway 
The following is the Norwegian roster for the Boys' ice hockey tournament at the 2016 Winter Youth Olympics.

Head coach: René Hansen

 Erik Beier Jensen
 Jens Bjornslett
 Sondre Bolling Vaaler
 Truls Brathen
 Pontus Finstad
 Kristian Hovik
 Sander Hurrod
 Markus Mikkelsen
 Fredrik Pedersen
 Mathias Emilio Pettersen
 Kalle Rode
 Lars Rodne
 Theo Rooseboom De Vries
 Oliver Skramo
 Alexander Thomas
 Kristoffer Thomassen
 Christian Wetteland

Russia 
The following is the Russian roster for the Boys' ice hockey tournament at the 2016 Winter Youth Olympics.

Head coach: Yevgeny Filinov

 Gleb Babintsev
 Maxim Denezhkin
 Grigori Denisenko
 Georgi Dubrovski
 Alexander Khovanov
 Vladislav Kotkov
 Pavel Kupchikhin
 Anton Malyshev
 Amir Miftakhov
 Kirill Nizhnikov
 Pavel Rotenberg
 Ilyas Sitdikov
 Yegor Sokolov
 Andrei Svechnikov
 Alexander Zhabreyev
 Bogdan Zhilyakov
 Danil Zhuravlyov

United States 
The following is the American roster for the Boys' ice hockey tournament at the 2016 Winter Youth Olympics.

Head coach: Scott Paluch

References

Ice hockey at the 2016 Winter Youth Olympics